Leighton and Eaton Constantine is a civil parish in Shropshire, England.  It contains 37 listed buildings that are recorded in the National Heritage List for England.  Of these, two are at Grade II*, the middle of the three grades, and the others are at Grade II, the lowest grade.  The parish contains the villages of Leighton, Eaton Constantine, and Garmston, and the surrounding countryside.  Most of the listed buildings are houses, cottages and farmhouses, a high proportion of which are timber framed.  The other listed buildings include two churches, one of which has listed memorials in the churchyard, a country house and associated structures, a milestone, and five cast iron pumps.


Key

Buildings

References

Citations

Sources

Lists of buildings and structures in Shropshire